Champagne Charlie may refer to:

People
 Charles Townshend (1725–1767), British politician nicknamed "Champagne Charlie"
Charles Heidsieck (1820–1871), French Champagne wine merchant who was originally called "Champagne Charlie"
George Leybourne (1842–1884), introduced the song "Champagne Charlie" to the London music hall, and was himself thereafter often referred to as "Champagne Charlie"
Charlie Nicholas (born 1961), Scottish footballer nicknamed "Champagne Charlie"
Charles Kennedy (1959–2015), 1999–2006 leader of the UK Liberal Democrats, dubbed "Champagne Charlie" by the press
Lord Carrington (1843–1928), British Liberal politician and aristocrat, dubbed "Champagne Charlie" by the press

The arts
"Champagne Charlie" (song), an 1867 popular music hall song
Champagne Charlie (1936 film), a 1936 American film with no relation to the play
Champagne Charlie (1944 film), a 1944 British musical film about the 1860s London music hall rivalry between performers George Leybourne and Alfred Vance
Champagne Charlie (album), a 1978 album by American singer Leon Redbone
Champagne Charlie (miniseries), a 1989 French-Canadian drama television miniseries about Charles Heidseick